Paul Prymke (born 8 December 1970) is a former Australian rules footballer who played with Melbourne in the Australian Football League (AFL).

Prymke, was recruited from Woodville-West Torrens, but came from Mildura. He was selected by Melbourne with pick 53 of the 1993 Pre-season Draft. In 1994 he played 24 league games, three of them finals, followed by another 21 the following year. A centre half-back, Prymke won Melbourne's "Best First Year Player" award in 1994 and was third in their 1995 best and fairest. He retired prematurely due to a back injury.

References

1970 births
Australian rules footballers from Victoria (Australia)
Melbourne Football Club players
Woodville-West Torrens Football Club players
Living people